Broadway Stages, Ltd. is one of New York’s full-service film and television production companies, with its headquarters in Greenpoint, Brooklyn. Broadway Stages’ studios can be found throughout Brooklyn, Queens and Staten Island. As of 2018 it has over 3 million square feet of integrated space including soundstages, locations, production services and parking.

History 
Broadway Stages was founded in 1983 by Tony Argento who turned a rundown movie theatre on Broadway Street in Astoria, Queens into his first soundstage. There he filmed commercials, and music videos for musical artists such as Aretha Franklin, Beyonce, Jay-Z, Justin Timberlake, LL Cool-J, Eminem, Whitney Houston, Queen Latifah, Celine Dion, Will Smith, Hall & Oates, TLC, Busta Rhymes and others.

The company expanded to Brooklyn where additional soundstages were built in Greenpoint, broadening from music videos to television and film production. Tony’s sister and current President and CEO Gina Argento, joined Broadway Stages after graduating from college,. Today the company manages over three million square feet of integrated space including unique locations, production services and more than 50 soundstages across New York City.

In addition to New York City, Broadway Stages also has facilities in Pitman, NJ and Savannah, GA.

Locations and Services 
Broadway Stages provides unique locations and the complete set of services for all sizes, styles and types of productions, including office space for writers and sketch artists, construction, wardrobe, lighting, storage, equipment and parking.

Community
Through financial, in-kind, and volunteer resources Broadway Stages actively supports economic and social growth, education, the arts, community betterment, and environmental sustainability throughout Brooklyn, Queens, Staten Island and greater NYC.  A commitment to community, local/state resourcing and environmental sustainability is a cornerstone of their business philosophy.

Environment
In addition to remediating Brownfield sites and repurposing them for economically beneficial soundstages, Broadway Stages installed solar panels, and both farm and garden rooftops on several of their soundstages in Greenpoint, Brooklyn.

Solar Rooftops
In 2010 Broadway Stages teamed with Greenpoint Energy Partners and Brooklyn-based Solar Energy Systems to install and maintain 50,000 square feet of solar electric facilities on five of its soundstage buildings in Greenpoint, Brooklyn.  With a capacity of 1.6 MW, this project represents one of the largest combined solar arrays deployed on a private facility in New York, and the largest in the TV and film production industry. The solar panels have offset approximately one third of Broadway Stages’ annual electricity consumption, provided improved air quality, increased reliability of the power grid during peak demand and created jobs.

Kingsland Wildflowers Project
In 2016 Broadway Stages collaborated with the New York City Audubon, Alive Structures and Newtown Creek Alliance to create a large scale, half-acre green roof on top of their soundstage at 520 Kingsland Avenue in Greenpoint. It donated the space, matched initial funding from the Greenpoint Community Environmental Fund, and continues to provide financial support for the infrastructure and garden maintenance.

The green roof was designed by Alive Structures and features species native to the Long Island Sound coastal lowlands, including native grasses such as stout blue-eyed grass and northern drop seed, heart-leaved golden alexanders, and asclepias tuberosa or butterfly weed — a host plant for monarch butterflies that also produces silky seed pod fibers used by orioles and goldfinches in their nests.

This bird-friendly rooftop wildflower meadow not only attracts wildlife, but also diverts rainwater runoff, and provides educational programs throughout the year. The garden is maintained by Alive Structures and the New York City Audubon together with the Newtown Creek Alliance manage the year-round educational programs and oversee wildlife monitoring through bat and bird microphones and swallow houses installed on the green roof.

Eagle Street Rooftop Farm
In 2008 the company funded New York City’s first-ever year-round, fully operational organic rooftop farm at their Eagle Street soundstage. Aimed at advancing the health of the environment and educating Brooklyn citizens about green initiatives, Broadway Stages provided Goode Green with its warehouse rooftop as the setting for Rooftop Farms, a commercially operated green roof program used for urban farming. 
During growing season, the green-thumbs with Eagle Street Rooftop Farm who cultivate organic produce supply a Community Supported Agriculture (CSA) program, an onsite farmers market, and fresh produce to area restaurants. In partnership with the food education organization Growing Chefs, the Eagle Street Rooftop Farm also hosts a range of farm based educational and volunteer programs. For more information visit Eagle Street Rooftop Farm.

Arthur Kill
In August 2017, Broadway Stages acquired the former Arthur Kill Correctional Facility, located in the Charleston section of Staten Island, from the Empire State Development for $7 million. It is repairing the former prison and converting parts of it into five new soundstages.

While under contract, before the closing of the sale, Broadway Stages spent $3.5 million to bring the prison up to code and brought production to Staten Island. Movies and television shows including Orange is the New Black, The Sinner, Blindspot, Ocean's 8, The Good Cop, and Daredevil, have filmed in the Arthur Kill facility.

Productions
The following are a list of some of the productions filmed at Broadway Stages' facilities:
 Unbreakable Kimmy Schmidt
 The Act (TV series)
 Billions
 Blacklist
 Broad City
 Blue Bloods
 Bull
 The Code
 Crashing (U.S. TV series)
 Daredevil
 The Defenders
 Definitely, Maybe
 The Detour (TV series)
 The Deuce (TV series)
 Difficult People
 Falling Water (TV series)
 FBI (TV series)
 Flight of the Conchords
 The Get Down
 The Good Fight
 The Good Wife
 Happy! (TV series)
 High Fidelity (film)
 How to Make it in America
 I, Robot
 Jessica Jones
 Limitless (TV series)
 Luke Cage
 The Marvelous Mrs. Maisel
 Madam Secretary
 Master of None
 Mr. Robot
 Mrs. Fletcher
 The Naked Brothers Band
 New Amsterdam (2018 TV series)
 New York Undercover
 NYPD Blue (Season 2)
 Ray Donovan
 Rescue Me (U.S. TV series)
 Royal Pains
 Saturday Night Live
 Search Party (TV series)
 She's Gotta Have It (TV series)
 Smash
 Sneaky Pete
 Spider-Man 3
 The Tick (2001 TV series)
 Unbreakable Kimmy Schmidt
 Unforgettable (2017 film)
 Veep
 The Woman in the Window (2019 film)

References

External links 
Broadway Stages' web site

American film studios
Television studios in the United States
Film production companies of the United States
Entertainment companies based in New York City
Entertainment companies established in 1983
1983 establishments in New York City
Greenpoint, Brooklyn